This is a list of Canadian television-related events in 1952.

Events
 The first Canadian urban cable television is launched in London, Ontario.
 August 22-2:30 PM, The CBC tests television broadcasting by airing the opening of the 73rd Canadian National Exhibition.
 September 6—The first television station in Canada, CBC's CBFT in Montreal, Quebec, begins bilingual broadcasting.
 September 8—The second television station in Canada, CBLT in Toronto, Ontario, begins English language broadcasting.
 November 1—Hockey Night in Canada premieres on CBC.
 November 29—CBLT Toronto presents the 40th Grey Cup game, the first time this Canadian football championship was televised.

Debuts

CBC
 September 6—Let's See (1952–1953)
 September 8
 The C.G.E. Show (1952–1959)
 CBC News Magazine (1952-1981)
 September 9—The Big Revue (1952-1953)
 September 10—Detective Quiz (1952)
 September 12—Carica-Tours (1952)
 October 31—CBC Concert (1952)
 November 1—Hockey Night in Canada (1952–present)
 December 26—Crossword Quiz (1952–1953)
 CFL on CBC (1952–2007)
 Open House (1952–1962)
 Sunshine Sketches (1952–1953)
 The Wayne and Shuster Hour (1952)

SRC
 Pépinot et Capucine (1952–1954)

Births
 May 13 - Mary Walsh, actress, comedian and social activist
 June 22 – Graham Greene, actor

Television shows

CBC
 CBC Concert (1952)
 The C.G.E. Show (1952-1959)
 Let's See (1952-1953)
 The Big Revue (1952-1953)
 Detective Quiz (1952)
 Hockey Night in Canada (1952–present)
 Crossword Quiz (1952-1953)
 CBC News Magazine (1952)
 Open House (1952-1962)
 Sunshine Sketches (1952-1953)
 The Wayne and Shuster Hour (1952)

SRC
 Pépinot et Capucine (1952-1954)

Ending this year

CBC
 October 1—Detective Quiz (1952)
 December 19-CBC Concert (1952)

See also
 1952 in Canada
 List of Canadian films

External links
 CBC Directory of Television Series at Queen's University